Hugo Rodríguez-Alcalá (1917–2007) was a Paraguayan writer, essayist, poet, narrator and literature critic. Doctorate in Laws and Social Sciences by the National University of Asunción in 1943. He earned a Ph.D. in literature from the University of Wisconsin in 1953.

He received Paraguay's National Prize for Literature in 1999.

References

 Los Poetas
 Los Poetas
 Ultima Hora

1917 births
2007 deaths
20th-century Paraguayan poets
Paraguayan male poets
Paraguayan essayists
Paraguayan literary critics
People from Asunción
Paraguayan expatriates in the United States
20th-century male writers
University of Wisconsin–Madison alumni